Arthur John Llewellyn Lewis (born 26 September 1941) is a former Wales international rugby union player. In 1971 he toured New Zealand with the British & Irish Lions and at the time played club rugby for Ebbw Vale.

Notes

Living people
1941 births
Rugby union players from Caerphilly
Welsh rugby union players
Wales international rugby union players
Barbarian F.C. players
British & Irish Lions rugby union players from Wales
Wales rugby union captains
Rugby union centres
Ebbw Vale RFC players
Cross Keys RFC players
Crumlin RFC players